The Sikh Empire  was a state originating in the Indian subcontinent, formed under the leadership of Maharaja Ranjit Singh, who established an empire based in the Punjab. The empire existed from 1799, when Maharaja Ranjit Singh captured Lahore, to 1849, when it was defeated and conquered in the Second Anglo-Sikh War. It was forged on the foundations of the Khalsa from a collection of autonomous Sikh Misl. At its peak in the 19th century, the Empire extended from Gilgit and Tibet in the north to the deserts of Sindh in the south and from the Khyber Pass in the west to the Sutlej in the east as far as Oudh. It was divided into four provinces: Lahore, in Punjab, which became the Sikh capital; Multan, also in Punjab; Peshawar; and Kashmir from 1799 to 1849. Religiously diverse, with an estimated population of 4.5 million in 1831 (making it the 19th most populous country at the time), it was the last major region of the Indian subcontinent to be annexed by the British Empire.

The foundations of the Sikh Empire can be traced to as early as 1707, the year of Aurangzeb's death and the start of the downfall of the Mughal Empire. With the Mughals significantly weakened, the Sikh army, known as the Dal Khalsa, a rearrangement of the Khalsa inaugurated by Guru Gobind Singh, led expeditions against them and the Afghans in the west. This led to a growth of the army which split into different confederacies or semi-independent misls. Each of these component armies controlled different areas and cities. However, in the period from 1762 to 1799, Sikh commanders of the misls appeared to be coming into their own as independent.

The formation of the empire began with the capture of Lahore, by Ranjit Singh, from its Afghan ruler, Zaman Shah Durrani, and the subsequent and progressive expulsion of Afghans from the Punjab, by capitalizing off Afghan decline in the Afghan-Sikh Wars, and the unification of the separate Sikh misls. Ranjit Singh was proclaimed as Maharaja of the Punjab on 12 April 1801 (to coincide with Vaisakhi), creating a unified political state. Sahib Singh Bedi, a descendant of Guru Nanak, conducted the coronation. Ranjit Singh rose to power in a very short period, from a leader of a single misl to finally becoming the Maharaja of Punjab. He began to modernise his army, using the latest training as well as weapons and artillery. After the death of Maharaja Ranjit Singh, the empire was weakened by east India British company stoking internal divisions and political mismanagement. Finally, by 1849 the state was dissolved after the defeat in the Second Anglo-Sikh War.

Background

Mughal rule of Punjab

The Sikh religion began around the time of the conquest of the Northern Indian subcontinent by Babur, the founder of the Mughal Empire. His conquering grandson, Mughal Emperor Akbar, supported religious freedom and after visiting the langar of Guru Amar Das got a favourable impression of Sikhism. As a result of his visit, he donated land to the langar and the Mughals did not have any conflict with Sikh gurus until his death in 1605. 

His successor Jahangir, saw the Sikhs as a political threat. He ordered Guru Arjun Dev, who had been arrested for supporting the rebellious Khusrau Mirza, to change the passage about Islam in the Adi Granth. When the Guru refused, Jahangir ordered him to be put to death by torture. Guru Arjan Dev's martyrdom led to the sixth Guru, Guru Hargobind, declaring Sikh sovereignty in the creation of the Akal Takht and the establishment of a fort to defend Amritsar. 

Jahangir attempted to assert authority over the Sikhs by jailing Guru Hargobind at Gwalior, but released him after a number of years when he no longer felt threatened. The Sikh community did not have any further issues with the Mughal empire until the death of Jahangir in 1627. The succeeding son of Jahangir, Shah Jahan, took offence at Guru Hargobind's "sovereignty" and after a series of assaults on Amritsar forced the Sikhs to retreat to the Sivalik Hills.

The next guru, Guru Har Rai, maintained the guruship in these hills by defeating local attempts to seize Sikh land and playing a neutral role in the power struggle between two of the sons of Shah Jahan, Aurangzeb and Dara Shikoh, for control of the Mughal Empire. The ninth Guru, Guru Tegh Bahadur, moved the Sikh community to Anandpur and travelled extensively to visit and preach in defiance of Aurangzeb, who attempted to install Ram Rai as new guru. Guru Tegh Bahadur aided Kashmiri Pandits in avoiding conversion to Islam and was arrested by Aurangzeb. When offered a choice between conversion to Islam and death, he chose to die rather than compromise his principles and was executed.

Formation of the Khalsa
Guru Gobind Singh assumed the guruship in 1675 and to avoid battles with Sivalik Hill rajas moved the guruship to Paunta. There he built a large fort to protect the city and garrisoned an army to protect it. The growing power of the Sikh community alarmed the Sivalik Hill rajas, who attempted to attack the city, but Guru Gobind Singh's forces routed them at the Battle of Bhangani. He moved on to Anandpur and established the Khalsa, a collective army of baptised Sikhs, on 30 March 1699. 

The establishment of the Khalsa united the Sikh community against various Mughal-backed claimants to the guruship. In 1701, a combined army of the Sivalik Hill rajas and the Mughals under Wazir Khan attacked Anandpur. The Khalsa retreated but regrouped to defeat the Mughals at the Battle of Muktsar. In 1707, Guru Gobind Singh accepted an invitation by Aurangzeb's successor Bahadur Shah I to meet him. The meeting took place at Agra on 23 July 1707.

Banda Singh Bahadur

In August 1708, Guru Gobind Singh visited Nanded. There he met a Bairāgī recluse, Madho Das, who converted to Sikhism, rechristened as Banda Singh Bahadur. A short time before his death, Guru Gobind Singh ordered him to reconquer Punjab region and gave him a letter that commanded all Sikhs to join him. After two years of gaining supporters, Banda Singh Bahadur initiated an agrarian uprising by breaking up the large estates of Zamindar families and distributing the land to the poor peasants who farmed the land.

Banda Singh Bahadur started his rebellion with the defeat of Mughal armies at Samana and Sadhaura and the rebellion culminated in the defeat of Sirhind. During the rebellion, Banda Singh Bahadur made a point of destroying the cities in which Mughals had been cruel to the supporters of Guru Gobind Singh. He executed Wazir Khan in revenge for the deaths of Guru Gobind Singh's sons and Pir Budhu Shah after the Sikh victory at Sirhind. 

He ruled the territory between the Sutlej river and the Yamuna river, established a capital in the Himalayas at Lohgarh and struck coinage in the names of Guru Nanak and Guru Gobind Singh. In 1716, his army was defeated by the Mughals after he attempted to defend his fort at Gurdas Nangal. He was captured along with 700 of his men and sent to Delhi, where they were all tortured and executed after refusing to convert to Islam.

Dal Khalsa period

Sikh Confederacy

The period from 1716 to 1799 was a highly turbulent time politically and militarily in the Punjab region. This was caused by the overall decline of the Mughal empire that left a power vacuum in the region that was eventually filled by the Sikhs of the Dal Khalsa, meaning "Khalsa army" or "Khalsa party". In the late 18th century, after defeating several invasions by the Afghan rulers of the Durrani Empire and their allies, remnants of the Mughals and their administrators, the Mughal-allied Hindu hill-rajas of the Sivalik Hills, and hostile local Muslims siding with other Muslim forces. The Sikhs of the Dal Khalsa eventually formed their own independent Sikh administrative regions, Misls, derived from a Perso-Arabic term meaning 'similar', headed by Misldars. These Misls were united in large part by Maharaja Ranjit Singh.

Cis-Sutlej states

The Cis-Sutlej states were a group of Sikh states in the Punjab region lying between the Sutlej River to the north, the Himalayas to the east, the Yamuna River and Delhi district to the south, and Sirsa District to the west. These states fell under the suzerainty of the Maratha Empire after 1785 before the Second Anglo-Maratha War of 1803–1805, after which the Marathas lost control of the territory to the British East India Company. The Cis-Sutlej states included Kalsia, Kaithal, Patiala State, Nabha State, Jind State, Thanesar, Maler Kotla, Ludhiana, Kapurthala State, Ambala, Ferozpur and Faridkot State, among others.

While these Sikh states had been set up by the Dal Khalsa, they did not become part of the Sikh Empire. There was a mutual ban on warfare following the treaty of Amritsar in 1809 (in which the empire forfeited the claim to the Cis-Sutlej States, and the British were not to interfere north of the Sutlej or in the empire's existing territory south of the Sutlej), following attempts by Ranjit Singh to wrest control of these states from the British between 1806 and 1809 

The Sikh crossing of the Sutlej, following British militarization of the border with Punjab (from 2,500 men and six guns in 1838 to 17,612 men and 66 guns in 1844, and 40,523 men and 94 guns in 1845), and plans on using the newly conquered territory of Sindh as a springboard to advance on the Sikh-held region of Multan, eventually resulted in conflict with the British.

Intra-Misl Wars 

After the reign of Jassa Singh Ramgarhia, the Sikh Misls became divided and fought each other. A sort of 'Cold War' broke out with the Bhangi, Nakkai, Dalelwala and Ramgharia Misls verses Sukerchakia, Ahluwalia, Karor Singhia and Kaniyeha. The Shaheedan, Nishania and Singhpuria also allied but did not engage in warfare with the others and continued the Dal Khalsa. 

The Phulkian Misl was excommunicated from the confederacy. Rani Sada Kaur of the Kanhaiya Misl rose in the vacuum and destroyed the power of the Bhangis. She later gave her throne to Maharaja Ranjit Singh.

Empire

The formal start of the Sikh Empire began with the unification of the Misls by 1801, creating a unified political state. All the Misl leaders, who were affiliated with the army, were the nobility with usually long and prestigious family backgrounds in Sikh history.

The main geographical footprint of the empire was from the Punjab region to Khyber Pass in the west, to Kashmir in the north, Sindh in the south, and Tibet in the east.

In 1799 Ranjit Singh moved the capital to Lahore from Gujranwala, where it had been established in 1763 by his grandfather, Charat Singh. 
Hari Singh Nalwa was Commander-in-Chief of the Sikh Khalsa Army from 1825 to 1837. He is known for his role in the conquests of Kasur, Sialkot, Multan, Kashmir, Attock and Peshawar. Nalwa led the Sikh army in freeing Shah Shuja from Kashmir and secured the Koh-i-Nor diamond for Maharaja Ranjit Singh. He served as governor of Kashmir and Hazara and established a mint on behalf of the Sikh empire to facilitate revenue collection. His frontier policy of holding the Khyber Pass was later used by the British Raj. Nalwa was responsible for expanding the frontier of Sikh empire to the Indus River. At the time of his death, the western boundary of the Sikh Empire was the Khyber Pass.

Geography 

Another more conservative estimate puts its total surface area during its zenith at 100,436 sq mi (260,124 km sq).

The following modern-day political divisions made up the historical Sikh Empire:
Punjab region, to Mithankot in the south
 Punjab, Pakistan, excluding Bahawalpur State
 Punjab, India, excluding the Cis-Sutlej states
 Himachal Pradesh, India, only the territories northwest of Sutlej river.
 Jammu Division, Jammu and Kashmir, India and Pakistan (1808–1846)
 Kashmir, from 5 July 1819 to 15 March 1846, India/Pakistan/China
 Kashmir Valley, India from 1819 to 1846
 Gilgit, Gilgit–Baltistan, Pakistan, from 1842 to 1846
 Ladakh, India 1834–1846
 Khyber Pass, Afghanistan/Pakistan
 Peshawar, Pakistan (taken in 1818, retaken in 1834)
 Khyber Pakhtunkhwa and the Federally Administered Tribal Areas, Pakistan (documented from Hazara (taken in 1818, again in 1836) to Bannu)
 Parts of Western Tibet, China (briefly in 1841, to Taklakot),
Jamrud District (Khyber Agency, Pakistan) was the westernmost limit of the Sikh Empire. The westward expansion was stopped in the Battle of Jamrud, in which the Afghans managed to kill the prominent Sikh general Hari Singh Nalwa in an offensive, though the Sikhs successfully held their position at their Jamrud fort. Ranjit Singh sent his General Sirdar Bahadur Gulab Singh Powind thereafter as reinforcement and he crushed the Pashtun rebellion harshly. In 1838, Ranjit Singh with his troops marched into Kabul to take part in the victory parade along with the British after restoring Shah Shoja to the Afghan throne at Kabul.

Religious policy

The Sikh Empire was idiosyncratic in that it allowed men from religions other than their own to rise to commanding positions of authority.

The Fakir brothers were trusted personal advisors and assistants as well as close friends to Ranjit Singh, particularly Fakir Azizuddin, who would serve in the positions of foreign minister of the empire and translator for the maharaja, and played important roles in such important events as the negotiations with the British, during which he convinced Ranjit Singh to maintain diplomatic ties with the British and not to go to war with them in 1808, as British troops were moved along the Sutlej in pursuance of the British policy of confining Ranjit Singh to the north of the river, and setting the Sutlej as the dividing boundary between the Sikh and British empires; negotiating with Dost Muhammad Khan during his unsuccessful attempt to retake Peshawar, and ensuring the succession of the throne during the Maharaja's last days in addition to caretaking after a stroke, as well as occasional military assignments throughout his career. The Fakir brothers were introduced to the Maharaja when their father, Ghulam Muhiuddin, a physician, was summoned by him to treat an eye ailment soon after his capture of Lahore.

The other Fakir brothers were Imamuddin, one of his principal administration officers, and Nuruddin, who served as home minister and personal physician, were also granted jagirs by the Maharaja.

Every year, while at Amritsar, Ranjit Singh visited shrines of holy people of other faiths, including several Muslim saints, which did not offend even the most religious Sikhs of his administration.
As relayed by Fakir Nuruddin, orders were issued to treat people of all faith groups, occupations, and social levels equally and in accordance with the doctrines of their faith, per the Shastras and the Quran, as well as local authorities like judges and panches (local elder councils), as well as banning forcible possession of others' land or of inhabited houses to be demolished. There were special courts for Muslims which ruled in accordance to Muslim law in personal matters, and common courts preceded over by judicial officers which administered justice under the customary law of the districts and socio-ethnic groups, and were open to all who wanted to be governed by customary religious law, whether Hindu, Sikh, or Muslim.

One of Ranjit Singh's first acts after the 1799 capture of Lahore was to revive the offices of the hereditary Qazis and Muftis which had been prevalent in Mughal times. Kazi Nizamuddin was appointed to decide marital issues among Muslims, while Muftis Mohammad Shahpuri and Sadulla Chishti were entrusted with powers to draw up title-deeds relating to transfers of immovable property. The old mohalladari system was reintroduced with each mahallah, or neighborhood subdivision, placed under the charge of one of its members. The office of Kotwal, or prefect of police, was conferred upon a Muslim, Imam Bakhsh.

Generals were also drawn from a variety of communities, along with prominent Sikh generals like Hari Singh Nalwa, Fateh Singh Dullewalia, Nihal Singh Atariwala, Chattar Singh Attariwalla, and Fateh Singh Kalianwala; Hindu generals included Misr Diwan Chand and Dewan Mokham Chand Nayyar, his son, and his grandson; and Muslim generals included Ilahi Bakhsh and Mian Ghaus Khan; one general, Balbhadra Kunwar, was a Nepalese Gurkha, and European generals included Jean-Francois Allard, Jean-Baptiste Ventura, and Paolo Avitabile. other notable generals of the Sikh Khalsa Army were Veer Singh Dhillon, Sham Singh Attariwala, Mahan Singh Mirpuri, and Zorawar Singh Kahluria, among others.

The appointment of key posts in public offices was based on merit and loyalty, regardless of the social group or religion of the appointees, both in and around the court, and in higher as well as lower posts. Key posts in the civil and military administration were held by members of communities from all over the empire and beyond, including Sikhs, Muslims, Khatris, Brahmins, Dogras, Rajputs, Pashtuns, Europeans, and Americans, among others, and worked their way up the hierarchy to attain merit. Dhian Singh, the prime minister, was a Dogra, whose brothers Gulab Singh and Suchet Singh served in the high-ranking administrative and military posts, respectively. Brahmins like finance minister Raja Dina Nath, Sahib Dyal, and others also served in financial capacities.

Muslims in prominent positions included the Fakir brothers, Kazi Nizamuddin, and Mufti Muhammad Shah, among others. Among the top-ranking Muslim officers there were two ministers, one governor and several district officers; there were 41 high-ranking Muslim officers in the army, including two generals and several colonels, and 92 Muslims were senior officers in the police, judiciary, legal department and supply and store departments. In artillery, Muslims represented over 50% of the numbers while the cavalry had some 10% Muslims from among the troopers.

Thus, the government was run by an elite corps drawn from many communities, giving the empire the character of a secular system of government, even when built on theocratic foundations.

A ban on cow slaughter, which can be related to Hindu sentiments, was universally imposed in the Sarkar Khalsaji. Ranjit Singh also donated large amounts of gold for the plating of the Kashi Vishwanath Temple's dome.

The Sikhs attempted not to offend the prejudices of Muslims, noted Baron von Hügel, the Austrian botanist and explorer, yet the Sikhs were described as harsh. In this regard, Masson's explanation is perhaps the most pertinent: "Though compared to the Afghans, the Sikhs were mild and exerted a protecting influence, yet no advantages could compensate to their Mohammedan subjects, the idea of subjection to infidels, and the prohibition to slay kine, and to repeat the azan, or 'summons to prayer'." Chitralekha Zutshi and William Roe Polk write that Sikh governors adopted policies that alienated the Muslim population such as the ban on cow slaughter and the azan (the Islamic call to prayer), the seizure of mosques as property of the state, and imposed ruinous taxes on Kashmiri Muslims causing a famine in 1832. In addition, begar (forced labour) was imposed by the Sikh administration to facilitate the supply of materials to the imperial army, a policy that was augmented by the successive Dogra rulers. 

These policies led the Kashmiri Muslim population to emirgate en masse to more lenient neighboring countries, particularly Ladakh. As a symbolic assertion of power, the Sikhs regularly desecrated Muslim places of worship, including closing of the Jamia Masjid in Srinagar and the conversion of the Badshahi Mosque in Lahore to an ammunition store and horse stable, but the empire still maintained Persian administrative institutions and court etiquette; the Sikh silver rupees were minted on the Mughal standard with Persian legends.

In 1839, a major pogrom, called the Allahdad, targeting the local Jews of Mashhad in Qajar Persia had occurred. A group of Persian Jewish refugees from Mashhad, escaping persecution back home in Qajar Persia, were granted rights to settle in the Sikh Empire around the year 1839. Most of the Jewish families settled in Rawalpindi (specifically in the Babu Mohallah neighbourhood) and Peshawar. Most of these Jews would leave for India during the partition of 1947.

Christian missionaries had been active in the Punjab even prior to the dissolution of the empire in 1849.

Administration 

The empire was divided into various provinces (known as Subas), them namely being:

Demography

The population of the Sikh empire during the time of Ranjit Singh’s rule was estimated to be around 12 million people. There were 8.4 million Muslims, 2.88 million Hindus and 722,000 Sikhs.

The religious demography of the empire is estimated to have been just over 10% to 12% Sikh, 80% Muslim, and just under 10% Hindu. Surjit Hans gave different numbers by retrospectively projecting the 1881 census, putting Muslims at 51%, Hindus at 40% and Sikhs at around 8%, the remaining 1% being Europeans. The population was 3.5 million in 1831, according to Amarinder Singh's The Last Sunset: The Rise and Fall of the Lahore Durbar. Hans Herrli in The Coins of the Sikhs estimated the total population of the empire to be around 5.35 million during 1838.

An estimated 90% of the Sikh population at the time, and more than half of the total population, was concentrated in the upper Bari Doabs, Jalandhar, and upper Rechna Doabs, and in the areas of their greatest concentration formed about one third of the population in the 1830s; half of the Sikh population of this core region was in the area covered by the later districts of Lahore and Amritsar.

Revenue

Decline

After Ranjit Singh's death in 1839, the empire was severely weakened by internal divisions and political mismanagement. This opportunity was used by the British East India Company to launch the First Anglo-Sikh War.

The Battle of Ferozeshah in 1845 marked many turning points, the British encountered the Punjab Army, opening with a gun-duel in which the Sikhs "had the better of the British artillery". As the British made advances, Europeans in their army were specially targeted, as the Sikhs believed if the army "became demoralized, the backbone of the enemy's position would be broken". The fighting continued throughout the night. The British position "grew graver as the night wore on", and "suffered terrible casualties with every single member of the Governor General's staff either killed or wounded". Nevertheless, the British army took and held Ferozeshah. British General Sir James Hope Grant recorded: "Truly the night was one of gloom and forbidding and perhaps never in the annals of warfare has a British Army on such a large scale been nearer to a defeat which would have involved annihilation."

The reasons for the withdrawal of the Sikhs from Ferozeshah are contentious. Some believe that it was treachery of the non-Sikh high command of their own army which led to them marching away from a British force in a precarious and battered state. Others believe that a tactical withdrawal was the best policy.

The Sikh empire was finally dissolved at the end of the Second Anglo-Sikh War in 1849 into separate princely states and the British province of Punjab. Eventually, a Lieutenant Governorship was formed in Lahore as a direct representative of the British Crown.

Timeline 
 1699: Formation of the Khalsa by Guru Gobind Singh.
 1710–1716: Banda Singh defeats the Mughals and declares Khalsa rule.
 1716–1738: Turbulence, no real ruler; Mughals take back the control for two decades but Sikhs engage in guerrilla warfare
 1733–1735: The Khalsa accepts, only to reject, the confederal status given by the Mughals.
 1748–1757: Afghan invasion of Ahmad Shah Durrani
 1761–1767: Recapture of Punjab region by Afghan in Third Battle of Panipat
 1763–1774: Charat Singh Sukerchakia, Misldar of Sukerchakia misl, establishes himself in Gujranwala.
 1764–1783: Baba Baghel Singh, Misldar of Singh Krora Misl, imposes taxes on the Mughals.
 1783: Sikh capture of Delhi and the Red Fort from the Mughals
 1773: Ahmad Shah Durrani dies and his son Timur Shah launches several invasions into Punjab.
 1774–1790: Maha Singh becomes Misldar of the Sukerchakia misl. 
 1790–1801: Ranjit Singh becomes Misldar of the Sukerchakia misl.
 1799, formation of the Sikh Khalsa Army
 12 April 1801 (coronation) – 27 June 1839: reign of Maharaja Ranjit Singh.
 March 1809 – August 1809: Nepal–Sikh War
 20 February 1810: Siege of Multan (1810)
 1 June 1813: Ranjit Singh is given the Kohinoor Diamond.
 13 July 1813: Battle of Attock, the Sikh Empire's first significant victory over the Durrani Empire.
 March – 2 June 1818: Battle of Multan, the 2nd battle in the Afghan–Sikh wars.
 3 July 1819: Battle of Shopian 
 14 March 1823: Battle of Nowshera
 30 April 1837: Battle of Jamrud
 27 June 1839 – 5 November 1840: Reign of Maharaja Kharak Singh
 5 November 1840 – 18 January 1841: Chand Kaur is briefly Regent
 18 January 1841 – 15 September 1843: Reign of Maharaja Sher Singh
 May 1841 – August 1842: Sino-Sikh war
 15 September 1843 – 31 March 1849: Reign of Maharaja Duleep Singh
 1845–1846: First Anglo-Sikh War
 1848–1849: Second Anglo-Sikh War

List of rulers

Gallery

See also 

 History of Punjab
 History of Pakistan
 History of India
 Kapurthala State
 Mughal Empire
 Sikh Khalsa Army

References

Citations

Sources

Further reading 
 Volume 2: Evolution of Sikh Confederacies (1708–1769), By Hari Ram Gupta. (Munshiram Manoharlal Publishers. Date: 1999, 383 pages, illustrated).
 The Sikh Army (1799–1849) (Men-at-arms), By Ian Heath. (Date: 2005).
 The Heritage of the Sikhs By Harbans Singh. (Date: 1994).
 Sikh Domination of the Mughal Empire. (Date: 2000, Second Edition. ).
 The Sikh Commonwealth or Rise and Fall of Sikh Misls. (Date: 2001, revised edition. ).
 Maharaja Ranjit Singh, Lord of the Five Rivers, By Jean-Marie Lafont. (Oxford University Press. Date: 2002).
 History of Panjab, By Dr L. M. Joshi and Dr Fauja Singh.
 Maharaja Ranjit Singh and his Times, By Bhagat Singh. (Sehgal Publishers Service. Date: 1990).
 Ranjit Singh—monarch mystique, By V. Nalwa. (Hari Singh Nalwa Foundation Trust. Date: 2022).

External links 

 Article on Coins of the Sikh Empire
 Sikh Confederacy 
 Confederacy of Punjab
 Sikh Kingdom of Ranjit Singh
 Battle of Jamrud

 
States and territories established in 1799
States and territories disestablished in 1849
1799 establishments in India
1849 disestablishments in India
History of Sikhism
History of Punjab
Sikh politics
Empires and kingdoms of India
Former monarchies of South Asia
Former countries in South Asia
Former countries in Central Asia
Former monarchies of Central Asia